Drug-induced pseudolymphoma results from exposure to medications, which results in cutaneous inflammatory patterns that resemble lymphoma, most frequently mycosis fungoides.

See also
Skin lesion

References

External links 

Drug eruptions
Drug-induced diseases